Eifion Evans may refer to:

 Eifion Evans (Archdeacon of Cardigan) (1911–1997)
 Eifion Evans (church historian) (1931–2017)